George Cosgrave (February 20, 1870 – August 4, 1945) was a United States district judge of the United States District Court for the Southern District of California.

Education and career

Born in Calaveras County, California, Cosgrave read law to enter the bar in 1895. He was in private practice in Fresno, California from 1895 to 1930.

Federal judicial service

On March 12, 1930, Cosgrave was nominated by President Herbert Hoover to a seat on the United States District Court for the Southern District of California vacated by Judge Edward J. Henning. Cosgrave was confirmed by the United States Senate on April 8, 1930, and received his commission the same day. He assumed senior status on August 31, 1940. He served in that capacity until his death on August 4, 1945.

References

Sources

External links
 

1870 births
1945 deaths
Judges of the United States District Court for the Southern District of California
United States district court judges appointed by Herbert Hoover
20th-century American judges
United States federal judges admitted to the practice of law by reading law